Hybrid is a 1997 American science fiction horror film, directed by Fred Olen Ray. It is a remake of the 1987 film Creepozoids.

Plot
A team of commandos take shelter in an abandoned research facility during an ion storm.  They are attacked by a creature which is a hybrid of human and alien.

Cast
 John Blyth Barrymore as Dr. Paul Hamilton
 Brinke Stevens as Dr. Leslie Morgan
 J.J. North as Carla Ferguson
 Tim Abell as McQueen
 Ted Monte as Milo Tyrel
 Peter Spellos as Sergeant Frank Blaine
 Bob Bragg as Pike
 Nikki Fritz as Susan
 Robert Quarry as Dr. Farrell

Production
The film starred John Blyth Barrymore who had appeared on several films for Fred Olen Ray. He says the film was shot in six days of which Barrymore filmed three.

The film includes footage from Ray's Biohazard: The Alien Force.

References

External links

Review of film at Letterbox DVD
Review at Mondo Bizarro

1997 films
Films directed by Fred Olen Ray
American science fiction horror films
1990s science fiction horror films
1990s English-language films
1990s American films